Hiram Paulding (December 11, 1797 – October 20, 1878) was a rear admiral in the United States Navy, who served from the War of 1812 until after the Civil War.

Naval career
The son of John Paulding, Paulding was born in Cortlandt, New York. He was appointed Midshipman on September 1, 1811. During the War of 1812, he served on Lakes Ontario and Champlain, commanding the second division from  during the Battle of Lake Champlain.

On his return from service in Macedonian with the Pacific Squadron (1818–1821), he spent a year's leave at Capt. Alden Partridge’s Military Academy (later Norwich University), Norwich, Vermont. While serving on the  Paulding was chosen to carry Commodore Hull's dispatches from Callao, Peru, to the mountain headquarters of General Simon Bolivar in the Andes; Paulding's journey of 1,500 miles on horseback was later recorded in his book, Bolivar in His War Camp. In 1830 he rejoined Constellation to serve as 1st Lieutenant, as she cruised the Mediterranean for two years, and in 1834 assumed command of the schooner  for another Mediterranean tour. Appointed to command the sloop-of-war  in 1838, he made a cruise in the West Indies and in 1841 became Executive Officer of the New York Navy Yard.

Between 1848 and 1852 he commanded  in the Baltic, North, and Mediterranean Seas, then assumed command of the Washington Navy Yard.

Promoted to commodore, Paulding took command of the Home Squadron followed aboard the flagship . The squadron was instrumental in foiling the expedition against Nicaragua underway by the American William Walker, who had dreamed of uniting the nations of Central America into a vast military empire led by himself. Through insurrection, Walker became president of Nicaragua in 1856 when Costa Rica declared war to him. After his surrender to an allied Central American army and his return to the United States, Walker attempted for a military comeback when he was captured in 1857 by a landing of Home Squadron Marines. Stateside controversy over the questionable legality of seizing American nationals in foreign, neutral lands prompted President James Buchanan to relieve Paulding of his command, forcing him into retirement.

In 1861, Paulding was appointed by President Abraham Lincoln to assist in building up a wartime fleet. He then took over the New York Navy Yard. Paulding was assigned to evacuate ships from the Norfolk Naval Shipyard, which the Confederates planned to seize, in April 1861. Paulding found that Charles Stewart McCauley, commander of the navy yard, had ordered destruction of the ships. Paulding had to complete the work of burning and scuttling the largest number of the ships. He was able to remove the USS Cumberland, towed by the USS Pawnee. The  was burned to the waterline, but it was refitted latter as the CSS Virginia. In August 1861, Paulding was named by Secretary of the Navy Gideon Welles to the Ironclad Board, responsible for approving designs for and construction of ironclad warships.

After the war Paulding served as governor of the Naval Asylum at Philadelphia and as post-admiral at Boston. Paulding died at Huntington, Long Island, New York, 20 October 1878. He published a Journal of a Cruise Among the Islands of the Pacific (1831).

Namesake
The destroyer  was named in honor of Rear Admiral Paulding.

Further reading

See also

Union Navy
Confederate Navy
CSS Virginia
Ironclad warship

Notes

References
 
 
Paulding, Hiram. Journal of a Cruise of the United States Schooner Dolphin, Among the Islands of the Pacific Ocean; and a Visit to the Mulgrave Islands, in Pursuit of the Mutineers of the Whale Ship Globe. New York: G. & C. & H. Carvill, 1831.
Paulding, Hiram. Journal of a Cruise of the United States Schooner Dolphin, Among the Islands of the Pacific Ocean; and a Visit to the Mulgrave Islands, in Pursuit of the Mutineers of the Whale Ship Globe With a Map. With a New Introduction by A. Grove Day, Senior Professor of English, Emeritus, University of Hawaii. Honolulu, University of Hawaii Press 1970.
Paulding, Hiram. "Bolivar in His War Camp" New York, 1834.
Spencer C. Tucker, Blue & Gray Navies: The Civil War Afloat, Annapolis: Naval Institute Press, 2006.

External links
Paulding's Letterbook of the U.S.S. Wabash, 1857 held by Special Collections & Archives, Nimitz Library at the United States Naval Academy

1797 births
1878 deaths
Union Navy admirals
United States Navy rear admirals (upper half)
United States Navy personnel of the War of 1812
People from Cortlandt, New York